Luruaco is a municipality and town in the Colombian department of Atlántico.

References

External links

 Gobernacion del Atlantico - Luruaco
 Luruaco official website

Municipalities of Atlántico Department